Jordan Wilkins (born July 18, 1994) is an American football running back who is a free agent. He played college football at Ole Miss. In his college career, he had 1,751 yards and 14 touchdowns at 6.4 yards per carry. Wilkins ran a 4.53-second 40-yard dash.

Early years
Wilkins attended and played high school football at Saint Benedict at Auburndale. He was considered as a four-star prospect. He received offers from Ole Miss, Auburn, Arkansas, Cincinnati, Memphis, Middle Tennessee State, Mississippi State, Purdue, Tennessee, Texas Tech, Vanderbilt, and Wisconsin. He originally committed to Auburn before his senior season. After a coaching change following Auburn's 2012 season, he decommitted and eventually signed and played for Ole Miss.

College career
Wilkins attended and played college football at Ole Miss from 2013 to 2017. He was redshirted as a freshman in 2013. In the 2014 season, he had 361 rushing yards and one rushing touchdown in 13 games. He significant amount of his production came in the game against Presbyterian, where he had 171 rushing yards and a rushing touchdown. In the 2015 season, he had 379 rushing yards and four rushing touchdowns. He had to sit out the 2016 season due to academic ineligibility. In his final season at Ole Miss in 2017, he had a stellar season. He rushed for over 100 yards in six games. Overall, he finished the season with 1,011 rushing yards and nine rushing touchdowns. He finished eighth in the SEC in rushing yards and ninth in rushing touchdowns in 2017.

Collegiate statistics

Professional career

Indianapolis Colts
Wilkins was drafted by the Indianapolis Colts in the fifth round with the 169th overall pick in the 2018 NFL Draft. In the season-opening 34–23 loss to the Cincinnati Bengals, Wilkins had 14 carries for 40 rushing yards to go along with three receptions for 21 receiving yards in his NFL debut. He scored his first rushing touchdown against the Tennessee Titans in Week 11. Marlon Mack returned to the Colts' backfield and caused Wilkins' production to decrease. He remained a threat rushing and receiving throughout the remainder of the season. He finished with 336 rushing yards, one rushing touchdown, 16 receptions, and 85 receiving yards. He made his playoff debut in the Wild Card Round against the Houston Texans with nine rushing yards in the 21–7 victory. In the Divisional Round loss to the Kansas City Chiefs, he had an 11-yard kickoff return.

In the 2019 season, Wilkins finished with 51 carries for 307 rushing yards and two rushing touchdowns in 14 games.

In Week 8 of the 2020 season, Wilkins had 113 yards from scrimmage and a rushing touchdown in the 41–21 victory over the Detroit Lions. He finished the 2020 regular season with 	84 carries for 308 rushing yards and one rushing touchdown to go along with 12 receptions for 105 receiving yards.	 He was placed on the reserve/COVID-19 list by the Colts on January 3, 2021, and activated on January 20.On October 30, 2021, Wilkins was waived by the Colts.

Jacksonville Jaguars
On November 8, 2021, the Jacksonville Jaguars signed Wilkins to their practice squad. He was released on December 7.

Tennessee Titans
On December 8, 2021, Wilkins was signed to the Tennessee Titans practice squad. His contract expired when the teams season ended on January 22, 2022. He re-signed with the team on March 18, 2022. He was released on August 16, 2022.

Indianapolis Colts (second stint)
On November 2, 2022, the Indianapolis Colts signed Wilkins to their practice squad. He was promoted to the active roster on December 20. He was released on January 3, 2023.

NFL career statistics

References

External links

Indianapolis Colts bio
Ole Miss Rebels bio

1994 births
Living people
People from Cordova, Tennessee
Players of American football from Tennessee
American football running backs
Ole Miss Rebels football players
Indianapolis Colts players
Jacksonville Jaguars players
Tennessee Titans players